Ina Bauer, married name Szenes, (31 January 1941 – 13 December 2014) was a German competitive figure skater. She won three consecutive West German national titles (1957–59) and invented the skating element which bears her name.

Personal life
Ina Bauer was born in Krefeld on 31 January 1941. Her father was a silk manufacturer. She married a Hungarian figure skater, István Szenes.

Szenes-Bauer died 13 December 2014.

Career
After winning the German national silver medal in 1956, Bauer was assigned to the European Championships in Paris, France and finished 13th. She then placed 20th at the World Championships in Garmisch-Partenkirchen, Germany.

The following season, Bauer won the first of her three German national titles. She placed tenth at the 1957 European Championships in Vienna, Austria and 11th at the 1957 World Championships in Colorado Springs, Colorado.

During the next two years, Bauer repeated as German national champion and achieved her highest international rankings. She placed fourth at the 1958 World Championships in Paris, France, the 1959 European Championships in Davos, Switzerland, and the 1959 World Championships in Colorado Springs, Colorado. During this time, she trained in Colorado Springs.

After withdrawing from the 1960 European Championships in Garmisch-Partenkirchen, Bauer retired from competition at her father's request. She then toured with Ice Follies and starred in two movies with Austrian alpine skier Toni Sailer.

Bauer invented the eponymous skating element.

Results

References

 Skatabase: 1950s Worlds

External links
 Bauer performing a layback spin
 

German female single skaters
German film actresses
1941 births
2014 deaths
20th-century German actresses
Sportspeople from Krefeld